Khurshid Alam Babul is a prominent ex-Bangladeshi footballer of the 1970 and the 80s.  An attacking midfielder he achieved most of his laurels while playing for Abahani KC in the Dhaka League during his 10-year spell with the club starting in 1977.
He won league titles with Abahani in 1977, 1981, 1983, 1984 and 1985. In 1987 he won the title with MSC. Thus he jloined an elite list of players who had won the Dhaka league title both the giants. He was a prominent footballer for the Bangladesh national football team during the early years of football in the country.

Success with Abahani
In 1977. Babul joined Abahani from Victoria SC. In the 4-2-4 system, he formed an midfield duo with Amalesh Sen. Monwar Hossain Nannu, generally regarded as the best creative midlfielder of the country during the first half of the 1970, had moved to the role of a central defender following a serious injury. 
Abahani enjoyed a memorable season as they won the league title remaining unbeaten throughout the league season. Later in the season they reached the SF of the Aga Khan Gold Cup, but lost 2–0 to the eventual champions Sepid-Rud club of Iran.
Overall, Babul won Dhaka League title with Abahani in 1977, 1981, 193, 1984,1985. He was the successful captain of the Abahani that won the 1981 league title. Abahnai remained unbeaten in the league till the final match of the season. With the title already won they lost the final match of the season 1–0 to BJMC. Winger Basudev scored the only goal of the match.

Move to MSC
After 3 successive titles between 1983 and 1985 Abahani lost their grip of the title to their arch rivals MSC in 1986. The management of Abahani felt the need for some changes and they reckoned that Babul was past his prime and he was released. 

Mohammedan SC signed Babul for the 1987 season. The final match of the season between Abahani and MSC started with Abahnai only needing a draw to secure the title. The exciting match was heading for a 2-2 draw till Babul scored an injury time winner.

With the teams finishing on equal points play off matches were required. After a 0–0 draw in the first play off match MSC secured the title with a 2–0 win in the 2nd play -off match. Thus Babul joined an elite group of players to win the Dhaka League title with both the Dhaka giants.

Awards
In 2012, Babul was awarded the national sports award for his outstanding contribution to Bangladesh football. His long time midfield partner Ashish also won the national sports award in the same year.

References

Bangladeshi footballers
Bangladesh international footballers
Mohammedan SC (Dhaka) players
Abahani Limited (Dhaka) players
Living people
1955 births
1980 AFC Asian Cup players
Recipients of the Bangladesh National Sports Award
Asian Games competitors for Bangladesh
Footballers at the 1982 Asian Games
Footballers at the 1986 Asian Games
People from Tangail District
Association football midfielders